N-Chloropiperidine is the organic compound with the formula C5H10NCl. A colorless liquid, it is a rare example of an organic chloramine, i.e. a compound with an N-Cl bond. It is prepared by treatment of piperidine with calcium hypochlorite. Typical of chloramines, the compound is so reactive that it is generated and used in situ rather than being isolated. The compound undergoes dehydrohalogenation to afford the cyclic imine.

References

Nitrogen–halogen compounds
Chlorine(−I) compounds
1-Piperidinyl compounds